is a Japanese singer-songwriter and actor. He is the vocalist of the rock band Peaky Salt (now inactive) in the name . He is represented with Dream Zero-One Inc.

Miura's father is actor Tomokazu Miura. His mother is former singer and actress Momoe Yamaguchi. Miura's brother is Takahiro Miura, who is also an actor. His cousin is actor and tarento Kenta Itogi.  He married voice actress and singer, Yui Makino in 2020.

Discography

Singles

Albums

Cover albums

Mini albums

Music videos

Filmography

Radio

Stage

Television

Advertisements

Live

Event appearances

References

External links
 
 
 (current blog, 13 June 2013 – ) 
 – (former blog, 8 August 2012 – 13 June 2013) 

Japanese male singer-songwriters
Japanese singer-songwriters
Japanese male pop singers
Japanese male rock singers
Japanese male actors
Universal Music Japan artists
Seijo University alumni
Singers from Tokyo
1984 births
Living people
21st-century Japanese singers
21st-century Japanese male singers